The Division of Bland was an Australian electoral division in New South Wales. The division was proclaimed in 1900, and was one of the original 65 divisions to be contested at the first federal election. It was abolished in 1906. It was named for Dr William Bland, a New South Wales colonial politician. Based in rural southern New South Wales, it included the towns of Narrandera, Young, Wagga Wagga and West Wyalong. Bland was held by Chris Watson, the first Leader of the federal parliamentary Labor Party and Australia's first Labor Prime Minister. When Bland was abolished in 1906, Watson transferred to South Sydney.

Members

Election results

References 

1901 establishments in Australia
Constituencies established in 1901
Bland